Valentin Chepteni is a Moldovan politician.

Biography 

He has been a member of the Parliament of Moldova since 2010. In July 2010, he left Alliance Our Moldova.

External links 
 Vocea Basarabiei, Marian Lupu: Nu putem exclude o regizare în gestul lui Cheptene
 Radio Free Europe, Deputatul Valentin Chepteni a părăsit Alianța Moldova Noastră
 Un deputat și-a anunțat demisia din fracțiunea parlamentară a Alianței Moldova Noastră. Chepteni: "Nu plec cu mare dorință din AMN"
 Curtea Constitutionala a validat mandatele a opt noi deputati
 Site-ul Parlamentului Republicii Moldova
 Alianţa Moldova Noastră

References

1973 births
Living people
Our Moldova Alliance politicians
Moldovan MPs 2009